Thomas Richard Rehorn Jr. (November 19, 1937–December 14, 1989) was a Democratic member of the Kansas State Senate from 1977 to 1984.

References

1937 births
1989 deaths
Democratic Party Kansas state senators
20th-century American politicians
Politicians from Kansas City, Kansas